Sunday Night with Matty Johns is an Australian sports television series aired on Fox Sports on 4 March 2013. The show previously on Monday nights, but changed to Sunday night in 2018.

The show expanded to two nights a week (Mondays and Thursdays) on Thursday 5 March 2015. In 2016, the show reverted to a single night (Mondays) due to Fox Sports televising Thursday Night Football.

Hosts
 Matthew Johns (Host)
 Nathan Hindmarsh
 Gorden Tallis
 Bryan Fletcher
 Brett Finch
 Lara Pitt
 Jamie Rogers
 James 'The Professor' Rochford
Chris Page
Emma Freedman

See also

 List of Australian television series
 List of longest-running Australian television series

References

External links 

Fox Sports (Australian TV network) original programming
Australian sports television series
2013 Australian television series debuts
Rugby league television shows